Pablo Acosta Villarreal, commonly referred to as El Zorro de Ojinaga ("The Ojinaga Fox") was a Mexican narcotics smuggler who controlled crime along a 200-mile stretch of U.S.-Mexico border. At the height of his power, he was smuggling 60 tons of cocaine per year for the Colombians—in addition to the incalculable amounts of marijuana and heroin that were the mainstay of his business. He was the mentor and business partner of Amado Carrillo Fuentes, the "Lord of the Skies", who took over after Acosta's death.

He made his operation base in the once little dusty border town of Ojinaga, Chihuahua, Mexico, and had his greatest power in the period around 1984–1986. Through a protection scheme with Mexican federal and state police agencies and with the Mexican army, Acosta was able to ensure the security for five tons of cocaine being flown by turboprop aircraft every month from Colombia to Ojinaga — sometimes landing at the municipal airport, sometimes at dirt airstrips on ranches upriver from Ojinaga.

Chains of luxurious restaurants and hotels laundered his drug money. While at first he managed only marijuana and heroin, Acosta Villarreal became increasingly involved in the cocaine trade near the end of his life. He established contacts with Colombians who wanted to smuggle cocaine into the United States using the same routes to Texas Acosta Villarreal was using to ship marijuana and heroin from across the border in Chihuahua.

Acosta Villarreal was killed in April 1987, as detailed in the documentary film American Federale, during a cross-border raid into the Rio Grande village of Santa Elena, Chihuahua, by Mexican Federal Police helicopters, with assistance from the FBI. Rafael Aguilar Guajardo took Acosta's place but he was killed soon after by Amado Carrillo Fuentes, who took control of the organization. The book Drug Lord by investigative journalist Terrence Poppa, chronicles the rise and fall of Acosta Villarreal through direct interviews he did with the drug lord.

In popular culture 
There is a popular rumor in Mexico that states that he was an informant for the US government on communism and guerrilla movements near the Mexico-US border. As narrated by the famous Mexican-folk (norteño) group Los Tigres del Norte, in the drug-ballad (narco-corrido) called "El Zorro de Ojinaga", written by Paulino Vargas, that narrates some of the exploits of Acosta Villarreal.

Pablo Acosta is alluded to in Cormac McCarthy's novel No Country for Old Men.

Acosta-Villarreal is portrayed in Narcos: Mexico by Gerardo Taracena.

References

External links 
Book: Drug Lord, the Life and Death of a Mexican Kingpin by Terrence Poppa.
Movie: "American Federale" by Michael Douglas Carlin

People from Chihuahua (state)
Guadalajara Cartel traffickers
Mexican drug traffickers
Juárez Cartel traffickers
1987 deaths
People shot dead by law enforcement officers in Mexico
1937 births